Cannonball is an Australian reality television game show that premiered on the Seven Network on 27 September 2017. It is hosted by Tim Ross and Ben Mingay, along with Rachael Finch and features contestants competing with celebrities. The water-based game show involves 15 couples competing on a lake attempting to jump the highest, slide the furthest and fly the highest.

The format for the show is a franchise that originated in the Netherlands by Talpa. The four-episode series is produced by ITV Studios Australia and filmed at the Sydney International Regatta Centre in Penrith, New South Wales, in Sydney's western suburbs.

Format
The competition involves a total of 36 teams of two competing in high level water games for a chance to win two new Suzuki Vitaras and over $35,000 in cash. The top two team in each episode will go to the finals with the best team of the day getting a prize of $5,000

Several celebrity participants competed including former My Kitchen Rules contestants Ash Pollard, Luciano Ippoliti, Alex Ebert and Gareth Cochran. Two celebrities appear on each episode doing the same challenges, and what ever team there score get the close to that team get $500.

Ratings
The premiere episode was met with disappointing ratings. As a result, the second episode of the series was rescheduled to late Friday night. It is unknown if the final two episodes made it to air.

See also
 Wipeout
 It's a Knockout
 Celebrity Splash!

References

External links
 Official Website

Seven Network original programming
2010s Australian game shows
2017 Australian television series debuts
2017 Australian television series endings
2010s Australian reality television series
English-language television shows
Television shows set in Sydney
Cannonball (game show)